El Capitan (accented Capitán, "The Captain" in Spanish) is the name of a rock formation in Yosemite National Park, California. 

El Capitan may also refer to:

Locations
 Agathla Peak, a peak south of Monument Valley, Arizona, is also known as El Capitan
 Pike's Peak, previously named El Capitan by early Spanish explorers
 El Capitan (Idaho), a peak in the Sawtooth Range, Blaine County, Idaho
 El Capitan (Mars), a rock on the planet Mars
 El Capitan (San Diego), a peak in East County, California, US
 El Capitan (Texas), a mountain in Guadalupe Mountains National Park, Texas, US
 El Capitan Dam, San Diego River, California, US
 El Capitan Reservoir or Lake, a reservoir in central San Diego County, California, US
 El Capitán State Beach, California, US
 El Capitan (Montana), a peak in the Bitterroot Range of western Montana, US
 El Capitan Pit, Prince of Wales Island, Alaska, the deepest limestone pit in the US

Buildings

Schools
 El Capitan (Arizona school), a public high school in Colorado City, Arizona
 El Capitan High School, Lakeside, California
 El Capitan High School, Merced, California

Theatres
 El Capitan Theatre, Hollywood, California
 Playhouse Theatre (Portland, Oregon), formerly El Capitan
 El Capitan Entertainment Centre, formerly Hollywood Masonic Temple, Hollywood, California

Transportation
 , a cargo ship of Southern Pacific Company's Atlantic Steamship Lines (Morgan Line), serving as USS El Capitan (ID-1407) briefly in World War I and finally lost in World War II after dispersal of Convoy PQ 17
 SS El Capitan, a Design 1049 cargo ship, previously Meridan and later USS Majaba serving through World War II now a dive site in Subic Bay, Philippines
 El Capitan (ferry), a San Francisco Bay ferry from 1868 to 1925
 El Capitan (train), a named passenger train

Films and TV
 El Capitan (film), a 1978 film directed and produced by Fred Padula
 El Capitan (DuckTales), a villain from Disney's animated television series DuckTales

Music
 El Capitan (operetta), composed by John Philip Sousa in 1896
 "El Capitan" (march), comprising themes from the Sousa operetta
 "El Capitan" (Idlewild song), by Scottish indie band Idlewild
 "El Capitan" (OPM song), a song by Californian-based band OPM
El Capitan, album by Tony Pabón 1974
El Capitan, album by Utah Phillips 1975
 "El Capitán", mambo by Tony Pabón

Other uses
 "El Capitan" Supercomputer in Lawrence Livermore National Laboratory
 El Capitan Books, a publisher of independent comic books and graphic novels
 OS X El Capitan, the twelfth major release of the Mac OS X operating system from Apple Inc.
 Texas Derby, a.k.a. El Capitan series, an annual soccer competition between Texas teams Houston Dynamo and FC Dallas
 El Capitan, a meteorite

See also
Captain (disambiguation)
Capitan (disambiguation)
Kapitan (disambiguation)
Kapitän
Katepano
Il Capitano